The Ministry of Labour and Social Policies is a department of the government of the Republic of Italy responsible for policies of labour, employment, labour protection, the adequacy of social security system, and social policy, with particular reference to the prevention and reduction of conditions of need and distress among the people. It is led by the Minister of Labour, a post held by Nunzia Catalfo since 5 September 2019.

References

External links
 Official website (Italian)

Labour
Italia
2001 establishments in Italy
Rome R. XVI Ludovisi